Peter O'Malley is a former association football player who represented New Zealand at international level.

O'Malley made his full New Zealand debut in a 1–4 loss to South Africa on 19 July 1947 and played just one further official international, appearing in 0–7 loss to Australia on 28 August 1948.

References 

Year of birth missing (living people)
Living people
New Zealand association footballers
New Zealand international footballers
Association footballers not categorized by position